The St. Bridget Church is a church in Axtell, Kansas, United States.  It was added to the National Register of Historic Places in 1996. The church was closed in 1967 by the Archdiocese of Kansas City, and in 1972 the building was transferred to the St. Bridget Historical Society to prevent its demolition.

It is a red brick  church which is one of the oldest Gothic buildings surviving in northeast Kansas.

References

External links
St. Bridget Historical Society

Buildings and structures in Marshall County, Kansas
Gothic Revival church buildings in Kansas
Churches on the National Register of Historic Places in Kansas
Former Roman Catholic church buildings in Kansas
Churches in the Roman Catholic Archdiocese of Kansas City in Kansas
National Register of Historic Places in Marshall County, Kansas